The 1920 St. Xavier Musketeers football team was an American football team that represented St. Xavier College (later renamed Xavier University) as an independent during the 1920 college football season. In its first season under head coach Joseph A. Meyer, the team compiled a 7–1 record and outscored opponents by a total of 299 to 38.

Schedule

References

St. Xavier
Xavier Musketeers football seasons
St. Xavier Saints football